Krasny Prospekt or Krasny Avenue is the central street and major thoroughfare in the city of Novosibirsk, Russia. Its length is about 7 km. It runs across the central part of the city starting from the right bank of the Ob River and terminates in the vicinity of Severny Airport. The main square of Novosibirsk - Lenin Square - is a part of Krasny prospekt, as well as Sverdlov and Kalinin squares.

Buildings and structures

Odd side of the street
 No. 1а – Alexander Nevsky Cathedral (1899)
 No. 1 – Zapsibzoloto Building (1930–1932, A. I. Bobrov; 1936, architect: V. M. Teitel)
 No. 3 – The School of the House of Romanov (1911–1912, A. D. Kryachkov, K. M. Lukashevsky; 1928–1932, K. E. Osipov, A. I. Bobrov)
 No. 5 - Novosibirsk State Art Museum
 No. 9 – Mashtakov House (1903)
 No. 11 – Kraisnabsbyt Building (1931–1934, B. A. Gordeev, S. P. Turgenev, N. V. Nikitin)
 No. 13 – Sibstroyputi Building (1932, I. T. Voronov; 1933–1935, V. M. Teitel)
 No. 15 – Mayakovsky Cinema (1968, G. P. Zilberman, G. V. Gavrilov)
 No. 15/1 – Buzolina House
 No. 17а – Saint Nicholas Chapel (1914, A. D. Kryachkov; 1993, P. A. Chernobrovtsev; 1993–1999, painter: A. S. Chernobrovtsev)
 No. 23 – City Trade House (1909–1912, A. D. Kryachkov)
 No. 25 – Business House (1925–1926, D. F. Fridman, I. A. Burlakov)
 No. 27 – Gosbank Building (1929–1930, G. B. Barkhin, M. G. Barkhin, M. Y. Ginsburg, A. D. Kryachkov)
 No. 29 –  Oblpotrebsoyuz Building or Sibkraisoyuz Building (1926, A. D. Kryachkov). The building located on the corner of Krasny Avenue and Ordzhonikidze Street
 No. 31 – Residential Building (1928–1930)
 No. 33 – Residential Building (1950s, V. K. Petrovsky)
 No. 41 – The Federal Service for Technical and Export Control
 No. 49–51 – Kuzbassugol Building Comlex (1931—1933, D. M. Ageev, B. A. Bitkin, B. A. Gordeyev)
 No. 53 – Army Staff Building (1934–1936, A. N. Shiryayev, Vengerov)
 No. 57 – Residential Building (1933)
 No. 59 – Residential House of the Red Army Officers (1931—1933, A. I. Bobrov)
 No. 63 – Officers' House  (1915–1917, A. D. Kryachkov; 1926–1928, B. M. Blazhovsky; 1943–1944, P. I. Safonov; 1974)
 No. 67 – Siberian Research Institute of Geology, Geophysics and Mineral Resources
 No. 75 – Dormitory of Novosibirsk State Academy of Water Transport
 No. 101 – Royal Park Shopping Centre (2007)
 No. 157/1 – House of Project Institutes
 No. 167 – 'Progress' Palace of Culture
 No. 171/4 – 'Energia' House of Culture

Even side of the street
 No. 6 – Sibmetaltrest Building (1929, D. M. Ageyev)
 No. 8 – Residential Building (1930s)
 No. 10 – Prombank Dormitory (1926–1927, I. A. Burlakov)
 No. 12 – Saburov House (1908)
 No. 16 – 100-Flat Building (1934–1937, A. D. Krychkov, V. S. Maslennikov, at the Exposition Internationale des Arts et Techniques dans la Vie Moderne in Paris on December 11, 1937, the project was awarded the 1st degree diploma, a gold medal, and a Grand Prix)
 No. 18 – Building of the Government of the Novosibirsk Oblast (1930—1932, A. D. Krychkov, B. A. Gordeyev, S. P. Turgenev, N. V. Nikitin, I. V. Kositsin, K. K. Leonov)
 No. 18/1 – State Concert Hall named after Arnold Katz (2013)
 No. 22 – Houses of Surikov and Molchanov
 No. 24 – Residential Building (1925)
 No. 26 – Russian-Asian Bank
 No. 26а – Novosibirsk Oblast Youth Library
 No. 28 – Dinamo Residential Complex (1930–1932, B. A. Gordeyev, S. P. Turgenev, N. V. Nikitin)
 No. 30 – NII-39 Residential Building (1953, G. F. Kravtsov)
 No. 32 – House of Lenin (1924–1926, I. I. Zagrivko, M. Kuptsov, V. M. Teitel)
 No. 34 – Prombank Building (1925—1926, A. V. Shvidkovsky, G. P. Golz, S. N. Kozhin; 1935—1954, N. S. Kuzmin, V. A. Dobrolyubov)
 No. 36 – Novosibirsk Opera and Ballet Theatre (1931–1941, T. Y. Bardt, M. I. Kurilko, A. Z. Grinberg and others)
 No. 38 – Building of State Institutions (1923–1924, A. D. Kryachkov; 1933–1936, S. M. Ignatovich)
 No. 44 – Aeroflot House (1930s)
 No. 46 – Oblsberkassa Building (1936)
 No. 48 – Gymnasium No. 1
 No. 50 – Dom Byta
 No. 52 – Novosibirsk State Medical Academy
 No. 54 – Institute of Mining of the SB RAS
 No. 56 – Oblplan House
 No. 60 – Residential Building (1950s)
 No. 62 – 'The General's House' (1937–1941, K, E, Osipov)
 No. 68 – The Wedding Palace
 No. 72 – Novosibirsk Aviation Technical College
 No. 78 – Residential Building (1955)
 No. 82 – Sovnarkhoz Building
 No. 84 – Institute of the Federal Security Service
 No. 184 – Novosibirsk Urban Planning Project Institute

Transportation

Metro
Four Novosibirsk Metro stations are located on the street: Ploshchad Lenina, Krasny Prospekt, Gagarinskaya and Zayeltsovskaya.

Notable residents
 Boris Galushchak was a director of the Novosibirsk Instrument-Building Plant. He lived in the 100-Flat Building.
 Nikolay Gritsyuk was a Novosibirsk painter. He lived in the 100-Flat Building.
 Yevgeny Meshlkin was an academician, famous Soviet and Russian cardiologist and cardiac surgeon. He lived in the 100-Flat Building.
 Yevgeny Mravinsky was a Soviet and Russian conductor. He lived in the 100-Flat Building.
 Alexander Tikhonov is a Soviet biathlete, multiple Olympic medalist. He lived in the 100-Flat Building.
 Nikolay Cherkasov was a Soviet actor and a People's Artist of the USSR. He lived in the 100-Flat Building.

References

External links

 Хребет Новосибирска. НГС.НОВОСТИ.

Tsentralny City District, Novosibirsk
Zayeltsovsky City District, Novosibirsk
Streets in Novosibirsk